Mieczysław Pawlikowski (9 January 1920 – 23 December 1978) was a Polish actor. He appeared in 25 films and television shows between 1951 and 1978.

Selected filmography
 Warsaw Premiere (1951)
 Colonel Wolodyjowski (1969)

References

External links

1920 births
1978 deaths
Polish male film actors
20th-century Polish male actors
People from Zhytomyr